The Magician is an American television series that ran during the 1973–1974 season. It starred Bill Bixby as stage illusionist Anthony "Tony" Blake, a playboy philanthropist who used his skills to solve difficult crimes as needed. In the series pilot, the character was named Anthony Dorian; the name was changed due to a conflict with the name of a real-life stage magician.

Plot
Blake was a professional stage magician who used his skills to solve crimes and help the helpless. Years earlier, Blake had been in prison on a trumped-up espionage charge in an unnamed country in South America. He discovered a way to escape with his cellmate, which began his interest in escapology. The cellmate died and left him a fortune. The escape, apparently followed by exoneration of the false charges that had led to it, led to Blake's pursuit of a career in stage magic, which made him famous. He never forgot his unjust imprisonment, and it motivated him to seek justice for others.
 
Initially, Blake used his Boeing 737 jetliner (named "The Spirit") as a base of operations; it was outfitted as a mobile residence ("It's like any other mobile home, only faster.") with live-in pilot Jerry Anderson (Jerry Wallace in the pilot episode, same actor). Blake drove a white Chevrolet Corvette with custom license plates ("SPIRIT") and, for its time, an exotic feature: a car phone. Blake frequently received assistance from acerbic columnist Max Pomeroy, and Max's brilliant son Dennis, who uses a wheelchair.

Midseason changes
Midway through the program's run, the idea of the airplane was dropped and Blake took up residence in a posh apartment at The Magic Castle, a real club devoted to magic acts in Los Angeles, California. At the same time, the supporting cast of the show was replaced with a new, single character, Dominick, a somewhat comical sidekick. No explanation for the changes was given in the series. Jerry continued to make occasional minor appearances, and Tony recruited Jerry and Max together for one further case in the new format.

Cast
 Bill Bixby as Anthony Blake (his character was named Anthony Dorian in the pilot episode)
 Keene Curtis as Max Pomeroy
 Joseph Sirola as Dominick
 Jim Watkins as Jerry Anderson (his character was named Jerry Wallace in the pilot)
 Todd Crespi as Dennis Pomeroy
 Cami Sebring as Kathy/Connie

Some episodes featured Larry Anderson, who later created the JawDroppers video magic course, as Blake's assistant.

Reception
The Magician earned an Average Audience Nielsen rating of 16.9, ranking it #52 out of 81 shows for the 1973-1974 TV Season.

Pilot

Episodes

Production

Magic on the program
The show is noteworthy in that Bixby, a keen amateur magician, insisted on performing all of the illusions in person, without any trick photography, although it was not possible for this to be the case in the TV-movie/pilot. Many of the episodes of the regular series were preceded by an announcement that the magic tricks were accomplished without trick photography. He was instructed in these performances by the program's technical advisor, Mark Wilson, who was credited as "magic consultant". Once the format changed to have the hero based in a magic club, Wilson could occasionally be seen on the stage there, as well. In addition to escapes, Bixby performed feats of sleight of hand, mentalism, and stage illusions. After the series' cancellation, Bixby went on to host a string of magic specials on NBC and a series, The Wonderful World of Magic, in first-run syndication.

Home media
Visual Entertainment released the complete series on DVD in Region 1 on August 25, 2017.

Influence
Though it ran only a single season, The Magician was an influence on later series. The show was a favorite of The X-Files creator Chris Carter, who worked it into Special Agent Fox Mulder's "origin" story: a teenaged Mulder was waiting to watch The Magician when his sister Samantha was abducted by mysterious forces.

In the Quantum Leap episode "The Great Spontini", Scott Bakula's character, Dr. Sam Beckett, leaps into an amateur magician in 1974 who aspires to appear on Bill Bixby's The Magician; however, owing to his partial amnesia, Dr. Beckett, at first, can only recall Bixby's connection with The Incredible Hulk, which had not been made at that time.

The Incredible Hulk series featured an episode that paid homage to both The Magician and Bixby's earlier series, My Favorite Martian. In The Incredible Hulk's "My Favorite Magician" episode, Bixby's character became the temporary apprentice to a stage magician played by Bixby's Martian co-star, Ray Walston. Mark Wilson was on hand again as the episode's "magic consultant" as well.  In addition, Martian co-star Pamela Britton appeared in an episode of The Magician.

Actor Andrew Robinson has stated that his Star Trek: Deep Space Nine character, Elim Garak, was partially influenced by Bixby's character.

References

External links
 
 The Magician by Ed Robertson

Television series by CBS Studios
Fictional stage magicians
NBC original programming
1970s American drama television series
1973 American television series debuts
1974 American television series endings
English-language television shows
Television shows set in California
Television about magic